Pye International Records was a record label founded in 1958, as a subsidiary of Pye Records. The company distributed many American labels in the UK, including Chess, Kama Sutra, Buddah, Colpix and King. (There was also an American label of the same name, which was later reorganized in the US as Prelude Records in 1976.)

First releases

25000 Ritchie Valens - Come On Let's Go/Dooby Dooby Wah (11/58)
25001 Seph Acre & the Pets - You Are My Love/ Rock and Roll Cha-Cha (11/58)
25002 The Judd Conlon Singers - Scene of the Crime/Bridge of Sighs (11/58)
25003 Bob & Jerry - Ghost Satellite/Nothin (11/58)
25004 The Pets - Wow-ee!/(You Wandered) Beyond the Sea (1/59)

Appearance
The first labels were blue, modelled on the magenta Pye-Nixa (later Pye) label. During its heyday, around 1961-64, it was red and yellow; later on it was pinkish violet, matching the Pye and Piccadilly labels of the time.

R&B series
Around 1964, some records featured the legend "R&B" on the central spindle, to reflect the popularity of rhythm and blues at the time, in the wake of British acts like the Rolling Stones being influenced by blues music. The letters especially featured on records licensed from the Chess and Checker labels: Chuck Berry, Bo Diddley, Howlin' Wolf, Muddy Waters, etc.

See also
 List of record labels
 Pye Records

British record labels
Record labels established in 1958
Pye Records
1958 establishments in the United Kingdom